Mixel Berhokoirigoin (16 August 1952 – 7 May 2021) was a Basque farmer and activist. He was the spokesperson for the self-styled group "Artisans of Peace" that promoted an act of disarmament of ETA in the Basque-French town of Baiona. He was part of a delegation of dialogue with the French Government.

He was born in Gamarte.

Berhokoirigoin died on 7 May 2021 after fighting a "serious illness".

References

1952 births
2021 deaths
French activists
French farmers
French-Basque people
Academic staff of Basque Summer University
People from Lower Navarre
20th-century farmers
21st-century farmers